Thathi Faqir Sahib is one of the 57 Union Councils of Abbottabad District in Khyber-Pakhtunkhwa province of Pakistan.

Location 
The union council of Thathi Faqir Sahib is situated in the northwest of Abbottabad district (34 km to the north west of the city). It is located in a valley, surrounded by large, forested mountains on three sides.

References

Abbottabad District